Markus Kaiser (born April 18, 2002) is a Canadian soccer player who currently plays as a midfielder for Cavalry FC in the Canadian Premier League.

Career

Youth 
Growing up in Calgary, Kaiser developed with the Calgary Foothills Academy. He attended the University of British Columbia, where he played for the men's soccer team and majored in chemical and biological engineering.

Cavalry FC 
Kaiser was drafted by Cavalry FC 14th overall in the 2022 CPL–U Sports Draft. He subsequently signed with the club in preseason. In the 2022 season, Kaiser was utilized as a depth player, making sporadic appearances off the bench.

Personal life 
His older brother, Daniel, is also a soccer player and played for Cavalry the year before Markus signed. Daniel Kaiser currently plays for Varsity FC.

References 

Canadian soccer players
Living people
2002 births
Association football midfielders
UBC Thunderbirds soccer players
Cavalry FC players